ROCS Kang Ding (PFG-1202) is a Kang Ding-class frigate of the Republic of China Navy.

Development and design 
As the ROC (Taiwan)'s defensive stance is aimed towards the Taiwan Strait, the ROC Navy is constantly seeking to upgrade its anti-submarine warfare capabilities. The US$1.75 billion agreement with France in the early 1990s was an example of this procurement strategy, the six ships are configured for both ASW and surface attack. The Exocet was replaced by Taiwan-developed Hsiung Feng II anti-ship missile and the AAW weapon is the Sea Chaparral. The main gun is an Oto Melara 76 mm/62 mk 75 gun, similar to its Singaporean counterparts, the Formidable-class frigates. Some problems in the integration of Taiwanese and French systems had been reported. The frigate carries a single Sikorsky S-70C(M)-1/2 ASW helicopter.

The Sea Chaparral SAM system is considered inadequate for defense against aircraft and anti-ship missiles, so the ROC (Taiwan) Navy plans to upgrade its air-defense capabilities with the indigenous TC-2N in 2020. The AMRAAM missiles will be quad-packed in a vertical launch system for future ROCN surface combatants, but a less-risky alternative arrangement of above-deck, fixed oblique launchers is seen as more likely for upgrading these French-built frigates.

Construction and career 
Kang Ding was launched on 22 March 1994 at the DCNS in Lorient. Commissioned on 24 May 1996.

Mid-Life Upgrade 
The Kang Ding class was originally intended to be equipped with Aster-15 and Arabel 3D / X-band multi-functional radar. However, due to cost and political difficulties, the upgrade never materialised. However, since 2019 a limited upgrade program has begun. In 2020, ROCN signed a contract to upgrade the DAGIE decoy system to the DAGIE MK2, which will permit the deployment of more advanced decoys and chaff such as SEALEM (RF for distraction and seduction), SEALIR (IR for distraction and seduction) and REM rockets. It was also observed that the Oto Melara 76 mm/62 mk 75 gun was upgraded with a new cupola with angled surfaces for signature reduction. 
In 2022, a deeper upgrade of the Kang Ding was announced, with the progressive installation of Huayang VLS for the TC-2N missile and upgraded Xunlian command and control systems across the entire fleet by 2025.

Guang Da Xing No. 28 incident 

In May 2013, Hong Shicheng, the captain of Guangxing 28, was killed by the Philippine Coast Guard’s fire on a Taiwanese fishing boat, which led to tensions between Taiwan and the Philippines. For this reason, the Southern Regional Patrol Bureau of the Coastal Patrol Administration of the Republic of China Executive Yuan’s Coastal Patrol Bureau announced on May 12. Kang Ding and the Jiyang-class missile frigate, formed a joint fleet to go to the waters around Taiwan and the Philippines to strengthen maritime patrols.

Gallery

References 

1994 ships
Ships built in France
Kang Ding-class frigates